Lakeside Amusement Park is a family-owned amusement park in Lakeside, Colorado, adjacent to Denver. Originally named White City, it was opened in 1908 as a popular amusement resort adjacent to Lake Rhoda by the Denver Tramway, making it a trolley park. The amusement park was soon sold to Denver brewer Adolph Zang. Eventually the name was changed to Lakeside Amusement Park, but the local populace kept referring to it by its original name for its glittering original display of over 100,000 lights. Today it is one of only thirteen trolley parks operating and one of the oldest amusement parks in the United States, and the oldest still running in Colorado. The park, comprising nearly half of the Town of Lakeside that it was responsible for creating in 1907, features the landmark Tower of Jewels.

History

The lone remaining American amusement park to have had the name White City, the park was originally built in the Exposition and White City architectural styles. Following its acquisition by Ben Krasner in the 1930s, Lakeside underwent a period of major renovations and incorporated many new features in the Art Deco style. Architect Richard L. Crowther designed much of Lakeside's Deco and Modern features and included a great deal of neon lighting in his work.

There are many examples of architectural salvage to be found throughout the park. Inside the main restaurant is a marble and mirror backbar that was saved from the Denver Union Station, one of the picnic pavilions is created from a retired center column of a ride, and the pool for the current Skoota Boats ride is an adaptive reuse of the original Shoot-the-Chutes ride.

The main office features a functioning manual telephone switchboard that is still in use.

A nominal admission fee is charged for each person entering the park. Children under the age of two are admitted free.  A coupon is issued to each person paying admission that can be redeemed for a ride coupon or be used towards the purchase of an unlimited ride pass.  There are three entrances:  a rarely used west gate accessed from the former Lakeside Mall parking lot, a drive-through auto gate accessed from Sheridan Blvd. and a walk-in entrance at the Tower of Jewels.  The admission fee is collected at these entrances; ride coupons and unlimited passes are sold inside the park.  This fare structure is a frequent source of confusion for first-time visitors.  Many patrons think that they are paying for parking because the admission fee is collected at the auto gate before the vehicle is parked.  Consequently, some people will turn around, park outside and try to walk in through the auto gate, only to be stopped and directed to one of the cashiers, who then need to explain that parking is always free and that it costs the same to enter whether they drive or walk in.

At one time, each ride was priced individually and had its own separate ticket booth.  Most of these booths were of the standalone type.  One notable exception was the Cyclone coaster, which had a built-in ticket booth between the entrance and exit ramps.  Eventually, ride coupons were implemented with a fixed amount for each coupon, and each ride required from one to six coupons.  Coupon sales were consolidated at four locations — the train depot, the carousel, the Ferris wheel, and Kiddy Play Land.  Unlimited ride passes are sold at the carousel, Ferris wheel, and Kiddy Play Land.  Many of the original ticket booths are still in place and are used for storage.

Rides

Roller coasters
The Cyclone is by far the most popular ride at the park. Built in 1940, it is an ACE Coaster Classic and Coaster Landmark.

Other amusement rides
Loop-O-Plane
Rock-O-Plane
Satellite
Hurricane
Auto Skooters (Bumper Cars)
Crystal Palace
Dragon
Ferris Wheel
Flying Dutchman
Heart Flip
Matterhorn
Merry-Go-Round
Orient Express (miniature railway)
Round-Up
Scrambler
Skoota Boats (Bumper Boats)
Spider (replaced for 2018 season)
Sports Cars
Tilt-A-Whirl
Whip
Wild Chipmunk
Zoom

Of note:
The Orient Express, the lake-circling,  gauge miniature railway train features the steam train locomotives "Puffing Billy" and "Whistling Tom" from the 1904 St. Louis World's Fair along with the world's first miniature gauge diesel locomotive, patterned after the California Zephyr.
The 1908 carousel was apparently made up from used figures from other carousels. Many of the animals bear characteristic designs of famed woodcarver Charles I. D. Looff. The carousel has also been credited to the Parker company, but the Lakeside horses do not have the typical Parker metal horseshoes.
Lakeside has every type of Eyerly "O-Plane" ride except for one: the "Fly-O-Plane."

Carousel details:
Type: 4 rows, Park, 3-level platform, all wood composition
Figures: 16 jumping horses, 16 standing horses, 4 chariots; figures include 2 bears, 4 burros, 3 deer, 4 dogs, 5 goats, 2 lions, 4 pigs, 4 rabbits, 2 tigers, 2 zebras, 2 panthers, 1 cheetah, 2 monkeys, and 3 cougars
Music: band organ music via pre-recorded audio tape played through loudspeakers, although a non-functioning Wurlitzer #157 Band Organ mock up is present

Kiddie rides

Coaster
Flying Tigers
Turtles
Wet Boats
Jolly Choo-Choo
Frog Hopper
Granny Bug
Horse & Buggy
Dry Boats
Captain Hook
Sky Fighters
Midge-o-Racers
Kiddie Whip
Motorcycles
Mini Skater

Former attractions
The Scenic Railway, the Glide and other attractions were destroyed by a fire on November 15, 1911. The skeletal remains of the Staride, a former Ferris wheel-type ride on the north side of the park, still stand. The sign for the old Speed Boats attraction, plus the pier for boarding, also stands vacant with a fence across the bridge stairs.

Other closed rides include the Tumble Bug, which operated from the 1930s until 1985, the Rocket Ships that closed after 1982, the Sky Slide removed sometime in the 1970s, the Paratrooper and the HeartFlip. Other later rides that are no longer open include the Flight to Mars portable travelling dark ride that could be found at the park into the early 2000s and was rented by Wisdom Industries, Sterling, Colorado, the Starship 2000, another short lived ride also from Wisom Industries of Sterling, Colorado, and the Rotor which is unknown when it opened or closed.

From the late 1930s through 1988, Lakeside Amusement Park operated Lakeside Speedway on the park grounds. The auto racetrack was a  oval and featured races of three car classes sponsored by CARC: stock, limited modified and fully modified. The race track was built on the site of the park's original baseball diamond and incorporated the original stands into the new use. The Track is standing but Abandoned As a some what Junk yard
 
Through 1985, there was a Funhouse located on the site now occupied by the Dragon. The Funhouse featured an animated Fat Lady mannequin (Laffing Sal, also known as Laughing Sal) that signaled the opening of the Funhouse and the main park in the evening by loud laughter. Inside, there were slides, moving floors, spinning discs, rolling barrels, and catwalks.

While not considered a ride, there was a Casino Theater just south of the Tower of Jewels. Concerts, plays, and dance marathons were held there while it was in operation. The building is still in place and is used for storage.   Also still in place is the old Riviera ballroom.

Media references
Lakeside is featured in the animated series "Thundarr the Barbarian" (Season 1, episode 10).
Lakeside is one of several parks featured in the 1999 public television program Great Old Amusement Parks.
Lakeside Amusement Park shares its name with a setting included in the video games Silent Hill & Silent Hill 3 by Konami.
Scenes from the movie Things to Do in Denver When You're Dead were also shot inside of the park.
Featured in a Westword Profile: "After 110 Years of Ups and Downs, a New Coaster Could Take Lakeside to New Heights."

Lawsuit 
In 2014, members of the Domino Service Dogs training group were denied access to the miniature train ride unless they wanted to leave their service dogs behind. As a result, the Cross Disability Coalition filed a lawsuit against the park alleging violations of the Americans with Disabilities Act and Colorado's laws ensuring access. The police department and the town of Lakeside were also included as defendants in the suit.

References

External links
Lakeside Amusement Park
After 110 Years of Ups and Downs, a New Coaster Could Take Lakeside to New Heights Westword. Denver, CO

Lakeside Amusement Park historic photos from the Denver Public Library
Lakeside Amusement Park photos and video at Theme Park Review

1908 establishments in Colorado
1 ft 10¾ in gauge railways in the United States
Amusement parks in Colorado
Buildings and structures in Jefferson County, Colorado
Carousels in Colorado
Landmarks in Colorado
Roller coasters in Colorado
Tourist attractions in Jefferson County, Colorado